This is a list of airlines currently operating in the Falkland Islands.

See also
 List of airlines

References

Falkland Islands-related lists
 
Falkland Islands
Falkland Islands
Lists of organisations based in the Falkland Islands